The annual NCAA Division III women's ice hockey tournament is a college ice hockey tournament held in the United States by the National Collegiate Athletic Association to determine the top women's team in the NCAA. The 2020 and 2021 championships were canceled due to the COVID-19 pandemic.

Origins 
The NCAA Division III championship of women's ice hockey began in 2002.

NCAA Division III women's ice hockey 

Seventy-one schools in the United States, ranging from the Midwest to the East Coast, sponsor varsity women's hockey at the Division III level. Eight conferences are currently recognized by the NCAA—Colonial Hockey Conference, Minnesota Intercollegiate Athletic Conference, New England Hockey Conference, New England Small College Athletic Conference, Northeast Women's Hockey League, Northern Collegiate Hockey Association, United Collegiate Hockey Conference, and the Wisconsin Intercollegiate Athletic Conference.

Format 
This tournament is a single elimination competition of ten teams. The semi-finals and finals are called the "Women's Frozen Four." The winners of the semi-finals move on to the championship, where the losers play in the third place game.

History

References 

NCAA Division III women's ice hockey